The Gordon Avenue Apartments is an apartment building at 424 Gordon Avenue in Thomasville, Georgia which is listed on the National Register of Historic Places.

It is a Tudor Revival building designed by Atlanta architects Daniell and Beutell and built in 1929.

Note that Gordon Avenue Historic District, an NRHP-listed district consisting of five houses and their grounds, is further out Gordon Avenue.

References

Residential buildings on the National Register of Historic Places in Georgia (U.S. state)
Tudor Revival architecture in the United States
Buildings and structures completed in 1929
National Register of Historic Places in Thomas County, Georgia